Widowmaker were a British hard rock group, active from 1975 to 1977.  They were considered by many to be a supergroup and released two albums. Although their influences appeared to offer vast creative possibilities, musical and personality differences led to their break-up. The legacy of Widowmaker is captured on the compilation Straight Faced Fighters (2002) released by Castle, which includes tracks from both of their albums.

History
The band was formed by former Mott the Hoople and Spooky Tooth guitarist Luther Grosvenor, also known as Ariel Bender. The original line-up featured vocalist Steve Ellis from Love Affair, guitarist Huw Lloyd-Langton from Hawkwind, Australian bassist Bob Daisley of Chicken Shack and drummer Paul Nicholls who had played with Lindisfarne.

A few months after they had begun rehearsing at Emerson, Lake & Palmer's Manticore Studios in London, the quintet were signed to Jet Records owned by Don Arden. A single release "On the Road" followed, in February 1976 and their debut album Widowmaker was released in the same year. The line-up for Widowmaker was augmented in the studio by vocalist and guitarist Bobby Tench from Streetwalkers and Hammond player Zoot Money. Widowmaker reached #196 in US and featured an eclectic mix of blues, country, folk and hard rock.

Widowmaker toured the UK with Nazareth and in June 1976 they took part in a series of nationwide stadium all-day concerts under the name of The Who Put The Boot In alongside leading rock acts such as Little Feat, The Sensational Alex Harvey Band, Streetwalkers and The Who, who were the headline act.

Ellis left the band after a tour of North America with Electric Light Orchestra and was replaced by vocalist John Butler and the band recorded their second album Too Late to Cry. Daisley joined Rainbow and Widowmaker broke up after the release of Too Late to Cry (February 1977).

Discography
Widowmaker, Jet 2310 432 (1976)
Too Late to Cry, (1977)
Straight Faced Fighters, (2002) (compilation, includes previously unreleased radio sessions)

Singles
Taken from the album Widowmaker
"On the Road"/"Pin a Rose on Me", Jet JET 766 (1976)
"When I Met You"/"Pin a Rose on Me", Jet JET 767 (1976)
"Pin a Rose on Me"/"On the Road", Jet JET 782 (1976) – UK No.53

Notes

References

External links

English rock music groups
Musical groups established in 1975
Musical groups disestablished in 1977